The 2016 WPA World Nine-ball Championship was the 25th edition of the 9-Ball pool World Championships. It took place from July 30 to August 4, 2016 in the al-Attiya Sports Arena of the Al-Arabi Sports Club in Doha. The Qatari capital was the seventh time in a row the venue for the 9-Ball Championships.

Albin Ouschan defeated American Shane Van Boening 13–6 in the final and became the first Austrian 9-ball world champion. This was the third Austrian World pool champion, after Gerda Hofstätter won the Women's WPA World Nine-ball Championship in 1995, and Oushchan's sister Jasmine Ouschan who won the WPA World Ten-Ball Championship in 2010.

The defending champion was Taiwanese player Ko Pin-yi, who lost to Jayson Shaw in the last 64.

Format
The tournament was attended by 128 players, of which the top 24 players in the world rankings qualified automatically. A total of 92 starting places were awarded according to a quota by the continental and regional associations as well as the hosting Qatari association and event sponsors. From July 25 to 28, 2016, a qualifying tournament was held in which 128 participants played in three knockout competitions for the remaining 12 starting places.

In the main tournament, the 128 participants were first divided into 16 groups of 8 players and competed there from July 30 to August 1 in the double knockout system against each other. Four players in each group qualified for the final round. This took place from August 2 to 4 and was played in the knockout system.

Prize money

Preliminary round

Group 1

Group 2

Group 3

Group 4

Group 5

Group 6

Group 7

Group 8

Group 9

Group 10

Group 11

Group 12

Group 13

Group 14

Group 15

Group 16

Knockout phase

Final

References

External links
Official Website
 WPA World Pool Championship 2016 at azbilliards.com

2016
WPA World Nine-ball Championship
WPA World Nine-ball Championship
International sports competitions hosted by Qatar
Sports competitions in Doha